Planier Light is an active lighthouse on the small Île de Planier (Planier island),  from Marseille, Bouches-du-Rhône, France. At a height of  it is the twelfth-tallest "traditional lighthouse" in the world.

The island is only accessible by boat, and both the site and the tower are closed to the public.

History
The first tower was built in the location in 1320 by Robert d'Anjou.

It was operated by two teams of two keepers alternating each month.

The design of a second lighthouse started February 15, 1823, by engineer Garella. It was approved November 17, 1823 and construction started at February 9, 1824, but terminated on September 23, 1825. It was later continued by a new contractor called Melchioni, and the new light was lit on March 1, 1829. The light characteristic used was a long white every 30s, and the lens was a 920mm lens. Vegetable oil was used until 1873 when it was replaced with mineral oil.

On February 17, 1876 construction of a new tower began by a contractor called Mendeville. Works were interrupted in October 1878 and terminated on May 21, 1879. A second auction was presented on September 18, 1879 and the tower was completed in July 1881. On December 1, 1881 the new light was moved to the new tower. The light was electrical with 300mm lens, and the characteristic used was three white flashes, separated by a red glow until 1902 when it was replaced by the current white flash every 5 seconds. In 1902 mercury bearings were installed.

In August 1944 during World War II, all towers were destroyed. This light served until the construction of the current lighthouse, which was lit on August 25, 1959. The current tower was designed by architects Arbus and Crillon. Three drafts were rejected by the Lighthouse Service, causing a delay in the construction.

The current structures include one story stone crew quarters.

The current light characteristic is one white flash every five seconds (Fl.W. 5s). The light is partially obscured.

See also

 List of tallest lighthouses in the world
 List of lighthouses in France

References

Lighthouses completed in 1774
Towers completed in 1774
Lighthouses completed in 1829
Lighthouses completed in 1882
Lighthouses completed in 1959
Lighthouses in France